
Gmina Gardeja is a rural gmina (administrative district) in Kwidzyn County, Pomeranian Voivodeship, in northern Poland.

Neighbouring gminas
Gmina Gardeja is bordered by the town of Kwidzyn and by the gminas of Kisielice, Kwidzyn, Łasin, Prabuty, Rogóźno and Sadlinki.

Villages
The gmina contains the following villages having the status of sołectwo: Bądki, Cygany, Czarne Dolne, Czarne Górne, Czarne Małe (sołectwos: Czarne Małe I and Czarne Małe II), Gardeja (sołectwos: Gardeja, Gardeja II, Gardeja III and Gradeja IV), Jaromierz, Klasztorek, Krzykosy, Morawy, Nowa Wioska, Otłowiec, Otłówko, Otoczyn, Pawłowo, Rozajny, Trumieje, Wandowo, Wracławek and Zebrdowo.

Other villages and settlements include: Albertowo, Czachówek, Dębno, Hermanowo, Jurki, Kalmuzy, Karolewo, Klasztorne, Klecewo, Międzylesie, Olszówka, Osadniki, Podegrodzie, Przęsławek, Rozajny Małe, Szczepkowo and Wilkowo.

References
Polish official population figures 2006

Gardeja
Kwidzyn County